Gosforth West may refer to:

 West Gosforth, an electoral ward, Newcastle upon Tyne, England
 Gosforth West Middle School, the former name of Gosforth Junior High School in Gosforth, Newcastle upon Tyne, England